Helichrysum nimmoanum is a species of flowering plant in the family Asteraceae. It is found only on the island of Socotra in Yemen. Its natural habitat is subtropical or tropical dry forests.

References

nimmoanum
Endemic flora of Socotra
Vulnerable plants
Taxonomy articles created by Polbot